Inez Isabel Maud Peacocke (31 January 1881–12 October 1973) was a New Zealand teacher, novelist and broadcaster. She was born in Devonport, Auckland, New Zealand in 1881. Ponsonby Peacocke was her grandfather.

She wrote fifty novels, mostly for children, but also 16 light adult romances. Significant works include My Friend Phil (1915) and Cathleen with a 'C' (1934).

References

External links
 
 

1881 births
1973 deaths
New Zealand broadcasters
New Zealand women novelists
New Zealand schoolteachers
People from Auckland
20th-century New Zealand novelists
20th-century New Zealand women writers